Mari may refer to:

Places
Mari, Paraíba, Brazil, a city
Mari, Cyprus, a village
Mari, Greece, a village, site of ancient town of Marius
Mari, Iran (disambiguation), places in Iran
Mari, Punjab, a village and a union council in Pakistan
Mari, Syria, ancient Near Eastern city-state
Mari El, a republic in Russia
Mari Autonomous Soviet Socialist Republic (1936–1990), an administrative division of the Russian SFSR, Soviet Union, and a predecessor to the Mari El mentioned above.
Mari Autonomous Oblast (1920–1936), an administrative division of the Russian SFSR, Soviet Union, and a predecessor to the Mari ASSR.
Mari (crater), an impact crater on Mars

Religion
Mari (goddess), Basque goddess
Māri or Mariamman, Indian goddess
Mari Native Religion, surviving pagan religion

People and fictional characters

Mari (given name), including a list of people and fictional characters with the name
Mari (surname), a list of people
Abba Mari (c. 1250–c. 1306), Provençal rabbi
Ayuki Mari (摩利), a supporting character in Kashimashi: Girl Meets Girl
Mari, Japanese novelist Mori Mari (茉莉, 1903–1987)
Mari (musician) (born 1985), Christian musician
La Mari, stage name of Spanish singer María del Mar Rodríguez Carnero (born 1975)
Marianne Steinbrecher (born 1983), Brazilian volleyball player known as Mari
Annu Mari (真理, born 1948), Indo–Japanese actress born Vasanthidevi Sheth
Mari people, a Volga-Finnic people
Mar Mari Emmanuel (born 1970), an Assyrian Australian metropolitan bishop
MARI, a character from the video game OMORI

Other uses
Mari language (disambiguation), several languages
Battle of Mari, a battle between the Mamluks of Egypt and the Armenians of Cilician Armenia in 1266
Mari Petroleum, a Pakistani petroleum exploration and production company
Mari (Noh play) - The Football
Mari, a 3D painting and texturing software by The Foundry Visionmongers
Mari, a 2019 album by classical violinist Mari Samuelsen

See also
Mari Letters, or Mari tablets, a large number of ancient texts excavated at Mari, Syria
Mary (disambiguation)
Marri (disambiguation)